Nathaniel C. Emerson (25 October, 1874 – 25 October, 1958) was a top-ranked American amateur tennis player in the early 20th century.

Personal life
Born in Cincinnati, Ohio on October 25, 1874 to Henry Emerson, Jr. & Eleanor Caldwell, he moved to Yakima, Washington by 1911, where he owned an apple orchard. Later he moved to Memphis, Tennessee, where he died on October 25, 1958, his 84th birthday.

Tennis career
He was ranked in the ranked in U.S. tennis top ten (No. 7) in 1908 and in the top 20 in 1909 (No. 17) and 1907 (No. 19). In the national doubles rankings, he was ranked No. 6 in 1908 and No. 9 in 1907.

He was a singles semifinalist at the 1908 U.S. National Championship (now known as the U.S. Open), and a doubles finalist at the U.S. National Championship in 1906 & 1908 (both times with L. Harry Waidner). They lost to future International Tennis Hall of Famers Fred Alexander and Harold Hackett in 1906, and Raymond D. Little and Beals Wright in 1908.

At the tournament now known as the Cincinnati Masters he: 
Was the first men's singles winner (1899)
Was a singles finalist in 1908
Defeated Fred Alexander in 1900 semifinals
Won five doubles titles – 1899 (with Burton Hollister), 1902 & 1903 (with Ernie Diehl), 1907 (with Raymond D. Little), and 1908 (with William P. Hunt).
Reached the doubles final in 1900 (with Diehl) and 1905 (with Robert Mitchell)
Still holds the record for most round of 16 appearances all-time at the Cincinnati Masters with 12 (tied with his brother, H. Truxtun Emerson, and Michael Chang)

Also, he was: 
Singles champion at the 1899 & 1900 Ohio State singles tournament
Singles champion at the Western Tennis Championship in 1907 & 1908
Singles champion at the Oregon State Tennis Championship in 1910
Singles finalist at the Western Tennis Championship in 1905, 1906 and 1907
Doubles winner of the Western Tennis Championship in 1906 & 1908
Singles winner of the 1908 Northwestern Championships
Singles winner and doubles finalist at the 1915 Tennessee State championships
Doubles finalist at the Oregon State Tennis Championship in 1910

He was inducted into the Cincinnati Tennis Hall of Fame in 2003.

Sources
From Club Court to Center Court by Phillip S. Smith (2008 Edition)
Wright & Ditson's Tennis Annual (1901 & 1909 Editions)

1874 births
1958 deaths
19th-century American people
19th-century male tennis players
American male tennis players
People from Memphis, Tennessee
Sportspeople from Yakima, Washington
Tennis players from Cincinnati